Daria Serenko (born 23 January 1993) is a Russian poet, curator and public artist. A feminist and LGBTQ activist.

Life
Daria Serenko was born in Khabarovsk in 1993, and studied at the Maxim Gorky Literature Institute. She lives in Moscow, where she works as a curator at the Municipal Library in Moscow.

In Serenko took part in the 2015-16 anti-militarist travelling art exhibition Ne Mir (No Peace). In her collaborative 2016 project Tikhii Picket (Silent Picket), participants create an A3 political poster and record reactions. Serenko herself permanently travelled with her Silent Picket poster, "three months under the supervsion of a poster" and as a result "constantly communicating with people, fifteen or twenty hours a day". One sign depicted a girl with her head in her arms inundated by the comments received if a women alleges rape ("she was probably drunk", "what was she wearing?"). She said, "Men, as always, laughed." In 2016 Serenko also curated a Moscow exhibition of Stuckist art.

In 2020 Serenko was one of the cofounders of Femdacha, a feminist retreat on the outskirts of Moscow.

On Valentine's Day 2021 Serenko organized a 'chain of solidarity' for female victims of political repression. After announcing the event on Facebook, she received an estimated 600 death threats. That year she worked for the campaign of human rights activist Alyona Popova, a candidate for the State Duma. In November 2021 she published a Facebook post underlining that migrants were only responsible for 3-4% of crimes in Russia. Soon afterwards, she discovered that her phone number and a home address had been leaked to far-right activists. The founder of the Male State movement urged his followers to "crush" the "scum", and she received thousands more death threats.

On 8 February 2022 Serenko was sentenced by Moscow's Tverskoy District Court to 15 days in jail for a September 2021 Instagram post advocating tactical voting. The post contained campaign symbols for the Smart Voting campaign of Alexei Navalny's' Anti-Corruption Foundation (FBK), proscribed in June 2021 as an 'extremist organisation'.

After the 2022 Russian invasion of Ukraine Serenko has participated in Feminist Anti-War Resistance, which on 27 February issued a manifesto calling on Russian feminists to oppose the war. Serenko herself published a statement calling on Russians to put aside political apathy and act:

In March 2022 Serenko was amongst 151 international feminists signing Feminist Resistance Against War: A Manifesto, in solidarity with the Feminist Anti-War Resistance.

Works

Poetry
 Siberia Burns: A Poem from Russia. Los Angeles Review of Books, 12 August 2001. Translated by Rachel Brazier, Serena Clapp-Clark, Paige MacKinnon, Helen Poe and Elizabeth Tolley.
 Contributor to Galina Rymbu et al. eds., F Letter: New Russian Feminist Poetry. ISOLARII, 2020

References

External links
 Inspiring Thursday: Daria Serenko

1993 births
Living people
21st-century Russian poets
Russian women poets
21st-century Russian women writers
21st-century Russian artists
21st-century Russian women artists
Curators from Moscow
Russian feminists
Russian LGBT rights activists
Russian women curators
Russian activists against the 2022 Russian invasion of Ukraine